Narco Cultura is a 2013 documentary film about the Mexican drug war in Ciudad Juárez, directed by Shaul Schwarz. The two main focal points of the movie are Edgar Quintero of the narcocorrido band Bukanas de Culiacán and crime scene investigator Richi Soto.

Reception
On review aggregator website Rotten Tomatoes, the film has a 89% approval rating based on 4 reviews, with an average ranking of 7.6/10. On Metacritic, the film have a score of 74 out of a 100 by 19 reviews, indicating "generally favorable reviews".

The Austin Chronicles Marc Savlov awarded the film with 4 out of 5 stars, while Tomas Hachard of Slant Magazine gave it 3 out of 4.

Writing for the National Catholic Reporter, Sr. Rose Pacatte wrote "Narco Cultura is about a "disturbingly glorified conflict" that no one is paying attention to and how pop culture functions in society and in commerce. For people who care, it is a film not to be missed".

Peter Rainer of The Christian Science Monitor called the documentary as "powerful", adding that the film "gets inside the world of two men who, in very different ways, inhabit this horror".

According to Ignatiy Vishnevetsky of The A.V. Club, the film is "[b]oth an unflinching record of Mexico's drug war and an investigation of how violence becomes unreal and glamorized".

Following its screening at the 2013 Sundance Film Festival, Justin Lowe of The Hollywood Reporter said "This issue-based journalism piece yields diminishing returns the deeper it digs".

Stephen Holden of The New York Times was of the same view, he added "There is nothing here that hasn't been more thoroughly documented in other studies of the drug-related crime that grips Juárez".

Geoff Berkshire of Variety praised the film for being an "eye-opening examination" and for "its unsettling pop-culture side effects", calling Narco Cultura "overwhelming [and] absorbing".

References

External links

2013 documentary films
2013 films
Documentary films about the illegal drug trade
Films about Mexican drug cartels
Mexican drug war
Mexican documentary films
Ciudad Juárez
2010s English-language films
2010s Mexican films